Evangelos "Vangelis" Tzolos (alternate spellings: Vaggelis, Tzollos) (born 14 August 1991) is a Greek professional basketball player who last played for Grindavík of the Úrvalsdeild karla. He is 1.92 m (6'3 ") tall and he can play at the point guard and shooting guard positions.

Professional career
Tzolos started his professional career playing with AEK Athens in 2009. After playing 4 years with the club, he joined Filathlitikos.

In 2014, Tzolos moved to Ikaros Kallitheas of the Greek 3rd Division. His amazing performances with the club drew the interest of several other clubs, and he finally moved to Ethnikos Piraeus of the Greek 2nd Division. Tzolos was the reserve point guard of the team, behind Fotis Vasilopoulos, and he helped his team to finish in 3rd place in the regular season, and in 4th place in the overall final league standings. On 22 July 2016, Tzolos joined the newly promoted to the top-tier level Greek Basket League club Kymis. 

Tzolos joined Olympiacos' new reserve team of the Greek 2nd Division, Olympiacos B, for the 2019–20 season. He spent the following season with Koroivos, averaging 13 points, 3.5 rebounds and 3.5 assists per game. 

In November of 2021, Tzolos returned to the first division, signing with Ionikos. In 14 games, he averaged 3.7 points and 1.3 rebounds, playing around 13 minutes per contest.

In August 2022, Tzolos signed with Grindavík of the Úrvalsdeild karla. He appeared in four games for Grindavík, averaging 8.3 points and 2.3 rebounds, before leaving in end of October.

References

External links
Eurobasket.com Profile
Greek Basket League Profile 
Draftexpress.com Profile
AEK.com Profile
Icelandic statistics at Icelandic Basketball Association

1991 births
Living people
AEK B.C. players
Doxa Lefkadas B.C. players
EFAO Zografou B.C. players
Larisa B.C. players
Ethnikos Piraeus B.C. players
Greek Basket League players
Greek expatriate basketball people in Iceland
Greek men's basketball players
Grindavík men's basketball players
Ikaros B.C. players
Ionikos Nikaias B.C. players
Koroivos B.C. players
Kymis B.C. players
Olympiacos B.C. B players
Panionios B.C. players
Point guards
Shooting guards
Úrvalsdeild karla (basketball) players
Basketball players from Athens